Pozharnitsy is a rural locality (a village) in Penkinskoye Rural Settlement, Kameshkovsky District, Vladimir Oblast, Russia. The population was 1 as of 2010.

Geography 
Pozharnitsy is located 24 km southwest of Kameshkovo (the district's administrative centre) by road. Dvoriki is the nearest rural locality.

References 

Rural localities in Kameshkovsky District